The 1914 Philadelphia Athletics season was a season in American baseball. It involved the A's finishing first in the American League with a record of 99 wins and 53 losses. They went on to face the Boston Braves in the 1914 World Series, which they lost in four straight games.

After the season, Connie Mack sold his best players off to other teams due to his frustration with the Federal League. The A's would then post seven consecutive last place finishes in the American League and would not win another pennant until 1929.

Regular season
The franchise took a downturn in 1914. The heavily favored Athletics lost the 1914 World Series to the "Miracle" Boston Braves in a four-game sweep. Miracles often have two sides, and for a few years this "miracle" wrought disaster on the A's. Mack traded, sold or released most of the team's star players soon after, and the team fell into a lengthy slump.

Season standings

Record vs. opponents

Roster

Player stats

Batting

Starters by position 
Note: Pos = Position; G = Games played; AB = At bats; H = Hits; Avg. = Batting average; HR = Home runs; RBI = Runs batted in

Other batters 
Note: G = Games played; AB = At bats; H = Hits; Avg. = Batting average; HR = Home runs; RBI = Runs batted in

Pitching

Starting pitchers 
Note: G = Games pitched; IP = Innings pitched; W = Wins; L = Losses; ERA = Earned run average; SO = Strikeouts

Other pitchers 
Note: G = Games pitched; IP = Innings pitched; W = Wins; L = Losses; ERA = Earned run average; SO = Strikeouts

Relief pitchers 
Note: G = Games pitched; W = Wins; L = Losses; SV = Saves; ERA = Earned run average; SO = Strikeouts

1914 World Series 

Boston Braves (4) vs Philadelphia Athletics (0)

External links
1914 Philadelphia Athletics team page at Baseball Reference
1914 Philadelphia Athletics team page at www.baseball-almanac.com

Oakland Athletics seasons
Philadelphia Athletics season
American League champion seasons
Oakland